The 1912 Saskatchewan general election was held on July 11, 1912 to elect members of the Legislative Assembly of Saskatchewan. Premier Walter Scott led the Liberal Party of Saskatchewan to a third term in office with a significant increase in the share of the popular vote. The opposition, now renamed from the Provincial Rights Party to the Conservative Party of Saskatchewan and led by Wellington Bartley Willoughby, lost both votes and seats in the legislature.

Results

Notes:
 1 Results compared to those of Provincial Rights Party in 1908 election, which became the Conservative Party.
 2 There were 54 seats contested at the 1912 election, however Cumberland was declared void and only 53 people were elected. A by-election was held on September 8, 1913 to fill the vacancy that existed in Cumberland.

Members of the Legislative Assembly elected
For complete electoral history, see individual districts

By-election, September 8, 1913

See also
List of Saskatchewan political parties

References
Saskatchewan Archives Board – Election Results By Electoral Division
Elections Saskatchewan - Provincial Vote Summaries

Further reading
 

1912 elections in Canada
1912 in Saskatchewan
1912
July 1912 events